Diesbach may refer to:

 Anna de Diesbach (1844–1920), a French rose breeder
 De Diesbach Castle, a castle in the Swiss canton of Fribourg
 Diesbach de Belleroche, a French family granted the Honneurs de la Cour in 1773
 Diesbach (Glarus), a village in the Swiss canton of Glarus
 Diesbach (patrician family), a patrician family originally from the Swiss city of Bern
 Johann Jacob Diesbach, an 18th-century German dye maker, best known for creating the dye Prussian blue

See also 
 Diessbach bei Büren, a municipality in the Swiss canton of Bern